Villa Borghese is a landscape garden in Rome, containing a number of buildings, museums (see Galleria Borghese) and attractions. It is the third-largest public park in Rome (80 hectares or 197.7 acres), after the ones of the Villa Doria Pamphili and Villa Ada. The gardens were developed for the Villa Borghese Pinciana ("Borghese villa on the Pincian Hill"), built by the architect Flaminio Ponzio, developing sketches by Scipione Borghese, who used it as a villa suburbana, or party villa, at the edge of Rome, and to house his art collection. The gardens as they are now were remade in the late 18th century.

History

In 1605, Cardinal Scipione Borghese, nephew of Pope Paul V and patron of Bernini, began turning this former vineyard into the most extensive gardens built in Rome since Antiquity. The vineyard's site is identified with the gardens of Lucullus, the most famous in the late Roman republic. In the 19th century much of the garden's former formality was remade as a landscape garden in the English taste (illustration, right). The Villa Borghese gardens were long informally open, but were bought by the commune of Rome and given to the public in 1903. The large landscape park in the English taste contains several villas. The Spanish Steps lead up to this park, and there is another entrance at the Porte del Popolo by Piazza del Popolo. The Pincio (the Pincian Hill of ancient Rome), in the south part of the park, offers one of the greatest views over Rome.

The Piazza di Siena, located in the villa, hosted the equestrian dressage, individual jumping, and the jumping part of the eventing competition for the 1960 Summer Olympics. A balustrade (dating from the early seventeenth century) from the gardens, was taken to England in the late 19th century, and installed in the grounds of Cliveden House, a mansion in Buckinghamshire, in 1896.  In 2004, a species of Italian snail was discovered, still living on the balustrade after more than 100 years in England.

Villas in the gardens

Today the Galleria Borghese is housed in the Villa Borghese itself.  The garden Casino Borghese, built on a rise above the Villa by the architect Giovanni Vasanzio, was set up by Camillo Borghese to contain sculptures by Bernini from the Borghese collection, including his David and his Daphne, and paintings by Titian, Raphael and Caravaggio
The Villa Giulia adjoining the Villa Borghese gardens was built in 1551 - 1555 as a summer residence for Pope Julius III; now it contains the Etruscan Museum (Museo Etrusco).
The Villa Medici houses the French Academy in Rome, and the Fortezzuola a Gothic garden structure that houses a collection memorializing the academic modern sculptor Pietro Canonica. In the 1650s, Diego Velázquez painted several depictions of this Villa's garden casino festively illuminated at night. Before electricity, such torchlit illuminations carried an excitement hard to conceive today.
Other villas scattered through the Villa Borghese gardens are remains of a world exposition in Rome in 1911.
The Galleria Nazionale d'Arte Moderna located in its grounds has a collection of 19th- and 20th-century paintings emphasizing Italian artists. 
Architecturally the most notable of the 1911 exposition pavilions is the English pavilion designed by Sir Edwin Lutyens (who later designed New Delhi), now housing the British School at Rome.

In popular culture
The villa's gardens feature in one of Ottorino Respighi's tone poem Pines of Rome
The gardens are described in, and the setting for, chapters 8-11 of Nathaniel Hawthorne's novel The Marble Faun

Other points of interest
The garden contains a replica of the Shakespeare's Globe Theatre built in 2003. 
Beside the 1911 Exposition's villas, there is the Exposition's Zoo, recently redesigned, with minimal caging, as the Bioparco, and the Zoological Museum (Museo di Zoologia).
In 1873 a hydrochronometer on the 1867 design of Gian Battista Embriaco, O.P. inventor and professor of the Roman College of St. Thomas was built in the gardens in emulation of the one at the College of St. Thomas.  Another version stands in the gardens of the Pincian Hill.  Embriaco had presented two prototypes of his invention at the Paris Universal Exposition in 1867 where it won prizes and great acclaim.

Gallery

See also
 List of parks and gardens in Rome

Notes

External links
1960 Summer Olympics official report. Volume 1. p. 81.
1960 Summer Olympics official report. Volume 2, Part 2. p. 899.
Galleria Borghese
 
 

Borghese
Gardens in Rome
Borghese, Galleria
Art gallery districts
Venues of the 1960 Summer Olympics
Olympic equestrian venues
Tourist attractions in Rome
Villa Borghese
Rome R. IV Campo Marzio
Rome R. XVI Ludovisi
Rome Q. I Flaminio